Jim Thijs (born 13 June 1980 in Leuven) is a Belgian pro triathlete. At the 2010 Xterra Triathlon World Championships, he finished 10th.

In 1995 Thijs raced his first triathlon in Aarschot. He had a very hard time to finish the 750m in freestyle, the breaststroke swimmers exited the water with him. From 1996 he started focusing on triathlon, leaving the other sports behind him.

In 2003, 2004 and 2005 Thijs' main goal was doing Ironman races. He won Ironman Malaysia and Ironman Lanzarote in the 18–24 age group. He qualified for Ironman Hawaii twice. Finishing 87th was his best result.

After 3 years of Ironman training Thijs decided to stop practicing triathlon and start doing mountainbiking instead. In his first Xterra races, Thijs was able to place himself amongst the best of Europe. He evolved from a European top level racer to a world class racer, finishing 10th at the 2010 Xterra World Championships in Maui, Hawaii.

Xterra

Thijs competes in cross triathlon: like triathlon there is swimming, biking and running involved but it's mountainbiking and trail running on mountains, hills and in rivers instead of racing with a racing bike and running on the road. Xterra triathlon is the name of the series of offroad races around the world.

Main results

 2x National Juniors Duathlon Champion (1998–2000)
 4th World Championships Junior Duathlon (2000)
 1st Ironman Malaysia age-group 18–24 (2004)
 4th (87th overall) Ironman Hawaii age-group 18–24 (2004)
 1st Ironman Lanzarote age-group 18–24 (2005)
 Ironman Hawaii finisher 2005
 3 podium results on national Elite Championships
 13 top 10 finishes in Xterra World Cup races
 4th Xterra European Championships (2008)
 13th Xterra World Championships (2008)
 5 wins in 2008

Results 2010

 1st off-road duathlon Zolder
 1st aquatlon Bergen op Zoom
 2nd Charleroi triathlon
 2nd Nato triathlon
 3rd off-road duathlon Putte
 6th European Championships ITU Cross Triathlon
 8th European Championships Xterra Italy
 8th Xterra Portugal
 10th Xterra Czech
 12th Belgian Championship mountainbike Elite Malmédy
 15th Zwintriatlon Knokke (mechanical problems)
 6th Xterra Switzerland
 10th World Championships Xterra in Maui, Hawaii

External links
 Official website Jim Thijs 
 Xterra Planet

Living people
Belgian male triathletes
1980 births
Sportspeople from Leuven